Pride: The Series is a digital drama, created by writer and actor Dorell Anthony, premiering in 2013. The drama streams on Amazon Prime Video.

Cast

Primary cast 

 Dorell Anthony (2013–present) as Kai Williams
 Ashley Mitchell (2013–present) as Trina Williams
 Braden Bradley (2013–present) as Travis Dalton
 Adam Andrew Rios (2013–present) as Adam Garza/Sheneeda Buffet

Supporting cast 

 Whitney Hoy (2014–present) as Lana Brixton
 Lauren B. Martin (2014–present) as Angela Torres
 Ilene Kristen (2014–present) as Professor Eleanor Brixton
 Vincent De Paul (2016–present) as Robert Newman
 Tony D. Head (2016–present) as George Williams
 Clayton Berger (2013–present) as Chad Roberts
 Aaron Mathias (2014–present) as Garret Fitzpatrick
 Scott Turner Schofield (2016–present) as Dr. Liev Hart
 Melissa Disney (2016–present) as Nancy Dalton
 Jared Tettey (2016–present) as Harrison Stone
 Corey Camperchioli (2014–present) as  Charlie Stevens
 Scott Michael Salame (2013–present) as Owen Roberts
 Terissa Kelton (2014–present) as Riley Heller
 Jonathan Rentler (2014) as Dealer 1
 Forest Van Dyke (2014) as Kenny 
 Jonathan Villanueva (2014–present) as  Luis Torres #2
 Brandon Polanco (2013–2014) as  Luis Torres #1

Special guest star 

 Tyler Wallach (2014) as Himself

Series overview

Episodes

Production 
Dorell Anthony initially created Pride: The Series in 2013, with executive producers Brandon Polanco and Jennifer Wilmeth, and core cast members Ashley Mitchell, Adam Andrew Rios, and Braden Bradley.

Ilene Kristen (Ryan's Hope, One Life to Live, General Hospital) and Lauren B. Martin (As the World Turns, Another World (TV series), Anacostia) joined the cast as special guest stars for the first season. Following the first season, the show took a hiatus to make changes behind the scenes. Polanco and Wilmeth departed the series and Mitchell was upgraded to executive producer, with Rios and Bradley serving as associate producers alongside Vincent de Paul and Megan Montfort. Rehab Entertainment, owned by John W. Hyde and Terissa Kelton joined as executive producers with Kelton portraying a new supporting character, Riley. Michael V. Pomarico (All My Children, multi nominated director) joined as series director. Sonia Blangiardo (All My Children, Days of Our Lives, Tainted Dreams) joined as consulting producer.

As of June 2019, Scott C. Sickles (One Life to Live, General Hospital) was announced as head writer of the show taking the series in a different direction more in line of what Anthony envisioned with Maryam Myika Day (SMARTASS, MOUNTAIN HIGH) as a writer.

The 3rd season is currently in pre-production.

Awards and recognition

References 

American television soap operas
Amazon Prime Video original programming
2013 American television series debuts